Teleiodes is a genus of moths in the family Gelechiidae.

Species
Teleiodes albidorsella Huemer & Karsholt, 1999
Teleiodes albiluculella Huemer & Karsholt, 2001
Teleiodes bradleyi Park, 1992
Teleiodes brevivalva Huemer, 1992
Teleiodes cyrtocostella Park, 1992
Teleiodes excentricella (Turati, 1934)
Teleiodes flavimaculella (Herrich-Schaffer, 1854)
Teleiodes flavipunctatella Park, 1992
Teleiodes gangwonensis Park & Ponomarenko, 2007
Teleiodes hortensis Li & Zheng, 1996
Teleiodes italica Huemer, 1992
Teleiodes kaitilai Junnilainen, 2010
Teleiodes klaussattleri Park, 1992
Teleiodes linearivalvata (Moriuti, 1977)
Teleiodes luculella (Hübner, 1813)
Teleiodes murina (Omelko & Omelko, 1998)
Teleiodes orientalis Park, 1992
Teleiodes paraluculella Park, 1992
Teleiodes pekunensis Park, 1993
Teleiodes qinghaiensis Li, 1999
Teleiodes saltuum (Zeller, 1878)
Teleiodes soyangae Park, 1992
Teleiodes vulgella (Denis & Schiffermuller, 1775)
Teleiodes wagae (Nowicki, 1860)

Former species
Teleiodes aenigma Sattler, 1983
Teleiodes alburnella (Zeller, 1839)
Teleiodes anguinella (Herrich-Schäffer, 1861)
Teleiodes angustipennis (Rebel, 1931)
Teleiodes brucinella (Mann, 1872)
Teleiodes cisti (Stainton, 1869)
Teleiodes decorella (Haworth, 1812)
Teleiodes epomidella (Tengström, 1869)
Teleiodes femoralis (Staudinger, 1876)
Teleiodes fugacella (Zeller, 1839)
Teleiodes fugitivella (Zeller, 1839)
Teleiodes gallica Huemer, 1992
Teleiodes minor Kasy, 1978
Teleiodes myricariella (Frey, 1870)
Teleiodes notatella (Hübner, 1813)
Teleiodes ostentella (Zerny, 1934)
Teleiodes paripunctella (Thunberg, 1794)
Teleiodes proximella (Hübner, 1796)
Teleiodes squamodorella (Amsel, 1935)
Teleiodes squamulella (Peyerimhoff, 1871)
Teleiodes thomeriella (Chrétien, 1901)
Teleiodes vovkella (Piskunov, 1973)

References

 
Litini
Moth genera